The French destroyer Aventurier was the name ship of her class of four destroyers that was built for the Argentine Navy in the early 1910s. The ships were taken over by the French Navy after the start of the First World War in August 1914. She was scrapped in 1940.

Design and description 
Their crew numbered 140 men.

The ships were powered by a pair of Rateau steam turbines, each driving one propeller shaft using steam provided by five mixed-firing Foster-Wheeler boilers.

The primary armament of the Aventurier-class ships consisted of four  guns in single mounts, one on the forecastle, one between the funnels, and two on the quarterdeck, in front and behind the searchlight platform. They were fitted with a  AA gun for anti-aircraft defence. The ships were also equipped with four single mounts for  torpedo tubes amidships.

Construction and career
Aventurier was ordered from Dyle et Bacalan and was launched on 18 February 1911 with the name of Mendoza at its Bordeaux shipyard. The ship was completed on 29 September 1914. She was stricken in 1938 and broken up for scrap in 1940.

Citations

References

1911 ships
Aventurier-class destroyers
Ships built by Dyle et Bacalan